Pinguiococcus is a genus of heterokonts.

It includes a single species, Pinguiococcus pyrenoidosus.

References

Ochrophyta
Monotypic algae genera
Heterokont genera